Parliamentary History is a peer-reviewed academic journal that publishes articles concerning the "history of parliamentary institutions in the British Isles".

External links 
 
 Print: 
 Online: 

Political science journals
Triannual journals
Wiley-Blackwell academic journals
Publications established in 1982
English-language journals